St. Stefan Serbian Orthodox Church (Ottawa), part of the Serbian Orthodox Eparchy of Canada, is located at 1989 Prince of Wales Drive in Nepean (Ottawa), the home of the Ottawa Serbian Church School Congregation and Community centre.

Today there are 2,000 families that call St. Stefan Serbian Orthodox Church their spiritual home. The majority of its members are of the first and second-generation, of course, though there are also those of the fourth and fifth-generation Canadians of Serbian descent. In 2021, a second Serbian Orthodox Church was inaugurated—The Meeting of the Lord—situated on Holland Avenue in Ottawa.

History
It all began with the initiatives of the late Russian interpreter for the Federal government, and activist Nikola Bogdanović (a third-generation Canadian born in Niagara Falls), Vida and Pero Senković (formerly of Montreal), Milan Budimirović, Sava Budimirović, Pera Petrović, Kole Porubić, and Miša Tričković before an Ottawa congregation was founded. In 1975 Rev. Bogdan Zjalić came to Ottawa to help organize a Church School Congregation.

On the day of St. Stefan, 9 January 1976,. after the consecration of the new Holy Trinity Serbian Orthodox Church (Montreal) Bishop Sava (Vuković) visited the Serbs in Ottawa. He celebrated the Holy Liturgy for the faithful in the area of Ottawa-Gatineau. Following Holy Liturgy, an organizational assembly was held, and a new Church Council was elected with Nikola Bogdanović as President and Dušan Savić, Ranko Ignatović, and Radoš Trišić as members of the board. Bishop Sava, with his official act, approved the Church School Congregation of St. Stefan in Ottawa. He appointed Rev. Krsto Rikić of Montreal as an administrator

More than a decade went by until the Church School Congregation, headed by a new board president Savo Budimirović, vice-president Stevan Tomić, treasurer Ana Vandusen, financial secretary Radmila Parojćić, auditors Radoš Trišić, Dane Dozet, and Josef Divić, purchased a house at 361 Dominion Street in Ottawa, where the facilities were adapted into a church parish. The Chapel was blessed in April 1990 by Bishop Georgije (Djokić), the first bishop of the Eparchy of Canada who immigrated from Bosnia and Herzegovina in 1984.

Many roadblocks occurred during the period of 1992 with the city restrictions forcing the chapel at 361 Dominion Street to be closed for two years where Serbs could only hold services at All Saints Anglican Church at 347 Richmond Road. Then in 1995 at the time when Protopresbyter Žarko Mirković was assigned in Ottawa the church board members decided to sell the Dominion Street property with all its zoning problems and purchase a building at 3662 Albion Road which was converted a year later to a temple and a community centre.

With the Yugoslav Wars, the NATO bombing of Yugoslavia and the Overthrow of Slobodan Milosevic that followed, the Serbs of Ottawa and the area increased exponentially and dramatically in numbers from the 1990s and the 2000s. In 2008 the Serbian congregation and community, composed of old settlers and majority newcomers, began to search for an appropriate location for their future home. They found the land (two adjacent parcels) and built a community centre (2011) and a temple (2013) in the architectural style of the Old Country at 1989 Prince of Wales Drive in Nepean (Ottawa)

Since 2005 the St. Stefan Serbian Orthodox Church holds an Ottawa Serbian Festival on Canadian Labour Day weekend.

See also
Saint Petka Serbian Orthodox Church
Serbian Orthodox Eparchy of Canada
Holy Transfiguration Monastery
Holy Trinity Serbian Orthodox Church (Montreal)
Saint Sava Serbian Orthodox Church (Toronto)
Saint Arsenije Sremac Serbian Orthodox Church
All Serbian Saints Serbian Orthodox Church (Mississauga)
Holy Trinity Serbian Orthodox Church (Regina)
Saint Michael the Archangel Serbian Orthodox Church (Toronto)
Saint Nicholas Serbian Orthodox Cathedral (Hamilton, Ontario)
Holy Trinity Serbian Orthodox Church (Regina)
Serbian Canadians
List of Serbian Orthodox monasteries
 List of people from Serbia
 List of Serbs

References 

Serbian Orthodox church buildings in Canada
Churches in Ottawa